BodyRockers is the self-titled debut studio album of English–Australian electronic music duo BodyRockers, consisting of Dylan Burns and Kaz James, which was formed in 2004.

After issuing of the album, the duo toured internationally in support of its release.

Follow-up
Although BodyRockers recorded material for a second album for release, it was never issued and the group disbanded in 2007 with both Dylan Burns and Kaz James pursuing solo careers.

Track listing
(Credits in parenthesis)

Singles
The album notably contains the duo's 2005 international single, "I Like the Way", that reached No. 3 on the United Kingdom Singles Chart, No. 12 on the Australian ARIA Singles Chart, and the Top 20 on both the United States Billboard Hot Dance Club Play and Hot Dance Airplay Charts.

BodyRockers released the follow-up single "Round & Round" that charted on the Australian ARIA Singles Chart reaching No. 33

References

2005 debut albums